Abrazar la Vida, released on October 28, 2003, is the fifth album by Luis Fonsi.

Reception

The AllMusic review awarded the album 3 and a half stars stating "Fonsi opens ABRAZAR LA VIDA with the plaintive torch song "Quien Te Dijo Eso?," akin to Babyface's country turn on "When Will I See You Again," followed by the more R&B-flavored, but still torch-laden, title song. However, the dance floor is not ignored, as Latin horn touches snake in infectiously on the frenetic "Yo Te Propongo," an almost dizzying number. On ABRAZAR LA VIDA, Fonsi reveals himself to be most comfortable in the modern crooner dye, and casts a satisfying pop shadow with his fifth album.".

Track listing 
 "¿Quién Te Dijo Eso?" – 4:33
 "Abrazar la Vida" – 3:34
 "Yo Te Propongo" – 4:47
 "Extraño Sentimiento" – 3:55
 "Por Ti Podría Morir" – 4:00
 "Yo" – 3:41
 "Viviendo en el Ayer" – 4:12
 "Te Echo de Menos" – 4:26
 "Eso Que Llaman Amor" – 4:07
 "La Fuerza de Mi Corazón" (duet with Christina Valemi) – 4:12
 "Elígeme" – 4:50
 "Se Supone" – 3:47

Personnel 

 Carolina Arenas – production Coordination
 Jose Blanco – mastering
 Valério Do Carmo – art direction
 Judy Figueroa – Graphic design
 Luis Fonsi – arranger, producer
 José Gaviria – arranger, keyboards, producer, programming
 Jeeve – arranger, direction, producer
 David Lopez – assistant engineer
 Manny López – arranger, engineer, programming
 Boris Milan – engineer
 Sergio Minski – production Coordination
 Joel Numa – engineer
 Mario Patiño – creative director, text
Cucco Peña – arranger, direction, producer
 Betsy Perez – production coordination
 Rudy Pérez – arranger, direction, producer
 Clay Perry – keyboards, programming
 Mark Portmann – arranger, producer
 Julio Estrada "Fruko" Rincón – arranger
 Milton Salcedo – percussion, producer, wind arrangements
 Kike Santander – producer
 Felipe Tichauer – engineer, mezcla
 Tony Vera – photography
 Juan Jose Virviescas – engineer
 Bruce Weeden – engineer
 Casey Felix – photography

Chart performance

Sales and certifications

References 

2003 albums
Luis Fonsi albums
Universal Music Latino albums
Albums produced by Rudy Pérez